In mathematics, an ordered field is a field together with a total ordering of its elements that is compatible with the field operations.  The basic example of an ordered field is the field of real numbers, and every Dedekind-complete ordered field is isomorphic to the reals.

Every subfield of an ordered field is also an ordered field in the inherited order. Every ordered field contains an ordered subfield that is isomorphic to the rational numbers. Squares are necessarily non-negative in an ordered field. Finite fields cannot be ordered.

Historically, the axiomatization of an ordered field was abstracted gradually from the real numbers, by mathematicians including David Hilbert, Otto Hölder and Hans Hahn. This grew eventually into the Artin–Schreier theory of ordered fields and formally real fields.

Definitions
There are two equivalent common definitions of an ordered field.  The definition of total order appeared first historically and is a first-order axiomatization of the ordering  as a binary predicate. Artin and Schreier gave the definition in terms of positive cone in 1926, which axiomatizes the subcollection of nonnegative elements.  Although the latter is higher-order, viewing positive cones as  prepositive cones provides a larger context in which field orderings are  partial orderings.

Total order
 if  then  and
 if  and  then

Positive cone
A  or preordering of a field  is a subset  that has the following properties:
 If  then   In particular, 
 The element  is not in 

A  is a field equipped with a preordering   Its non-zero elements  form a subgroup of the multiplicative group of 

An ordered field is a field  together with a positive cone 

Equivalence of the two definitions
Let  be a field.

Examples of ordered fields
Examples of ordered fields are:
 the rational numbers
 the real numbers
 any subfield of an ordered field, such as the real algebraic numbers or computable numbers
This ordered field is not Archimedean.
 The field  of formal Laurent series with real coefficients, where x is taken to be infinitesimal and positive
 the transseries
 real closed fields
 the superreal numbers
 the hyperreal numbers

The surreal numbers form a proper class rather than a set, but otherwise obey the axioms of an ordered field. Every ordered field can be embedded into the surreal numbers.

Properties of ordered fields

For every a, b, c, d in F:
 Either −a ≤ 0 ≤ a or a ≤ 0 ≤ −a.
 One can "add inequalities": if a ≤ b and c ≤ d, then a + c ≤ b + d.
 One can "multiply inequalities with positive elements": if a ≤ b and 0 ≤ c, then ac ≤ bc.
 Transitivity of inequality: if a < b and b < c, then a < c.
 If a < b and a, b > 0, then 1/b < 1/a.
 An ordered field has characteristic 0. (Since 1 > 0, then 1 + 1 > 0, and 1 + 1 + 1 > 0, etc. If the field had characteristic p > 0, then −1 would be the sum of p − 1 ones, but −1 is not positive.)  In particular, finite fields cannot be ordered.
 Squares are non-negative: 0 ≤ a2 for all a in F.
 Every non-trivial sum of squares is nonzero.  Equivalently: 

Every subfield of an ordered field is also an ordered field (inheriting the induced ordering). The smallest subfield is isomorphic to the rationals (as for any other field of characteristic 0), and the order on this rational subfield is the same as the order of the rationals themselves. If every element of an ordered field lies between two elements of its rational subfield, then the field is said to be Archimedean. Otherwise, such field is a non-Archimedean ordered field and contains infinitesimals. For example, the real numbers form an Archimedean field, but hyperreal numbers form a non-Archimedean field, because it extends real numbers with elements greater than any standard natural number.

An ordered field F is isomorphic to the real number field R if every non-empty subset of F with an upper bound in F has a least upper bound in F. This property implies that the field is Archimedean.

Vector spaces over an ordered field
Vector spaces (particularly, n-spaces) over an ordered field exhibit some special properties and have some specific structures, namely: orientation, convexity, and positively-definite inner product. See Real coordinate space#Geometric properties and uses for discussion of those properties of Rn, which can be generalized to vector spaces over other ordered fields.

Orderability of fields
Every ordered field is a formally real field, i.e., 0 cannot be written as a sum of nonzero squares.

Conversely, every formally real field can be equipped with a compatible total order, that will turn it into an ordered field. (This order need not be uniquely determined.) The proof uses Zorn's lemma.

Finite fields and more generally fields of positive characteristic cannot be turned into ordered fields, because in characteristic p, the element −1 can be written as a sum of (p − 1) squares 12. The complex numbers also cannot be turned into an ordered field, as −1 is a square of the imaginary unit i. Also, the p-adic numbers cannot be ordered, since according to Hensel's lemma Q2 contains a square root of −7, thus 12+12+12+22+()2=0, and Qp (p > 2) contains a square root of 1−p, thus (p−1)⋅12+()2=0.

Topology induced by the order
If F is equipped with the order topology arising from the total order ≤, then the axioms guarantee that the operations + and × are continuous, so that F is a topological field.

Harrison topology
The Harrison topology is a topology on the set of orderings XF of a formally real field F.  Each order can be regarded as a multiplicative group homomorphism from F∗ onto ±1.  Giving ±1 the discrete topology and ±1F the product topology induces the subspace topology on XF.  The Harrison sets  form a subbasis for the Harrison topology.  The product is a Boolean space (compact, Hausdorff and totally disconnected), and XF is a closed subset, hence again Boolean.

Fans and superordered fields

A fan on F is a preordering T with the property that if S is a subgroup of index 2 in F∗ containing T − {0} and not containing −1 then S is an ordering (that is, S is closed under addition).  A superordered field is a totally real field in which the set of sums of squares forms a fan.

See also

Notes

References

 
 
 

Real algebraic geometry
Ordered algebraic structures
Ordered groups